Vladychnevo is a rural locality (a village) in Novlenskoye Rural Settlement, Vologodsky District, Vologda Oblast, Russia. The population was 13 as of 2002.

Geography 
The distance to Vologda is 65 km, to Novlenskoye is 5 km. Pavshino, Knyazhevo, Semryukhovo, Chernevo, Kurdumovo, Telyachyevo are the nearest rural localities.

References 

Rural localities in Vologodsky District